Flagstaff Hill is a hill on Unga Island, Alaska, United States.  Its name comes from the fact that there was a flagpole on the hill.  The name may also be connected to the nearby Flagstaff Mine.

Flagstaff Hill is on the northern side of the entrance to the island's Delarof Bay.

The U.S. National Geodetic Survey first published information on Flagstaff Hill in 1916.  The name was entered into the Survey's Geographic Names Information System on March 31, 1981.

References

Landforms of Aleutians East Borough, Alaska
Hills of Alaska